Marianthus erubescens, commonly known as red billardiera, is a twining shrub or climber of the pittosporum family, Pittosporaceae. The species is endemic to the south-west of Western Australia. It has glossy lanceolate leaves that are 20 to 30 mm long.  Red tubular flowers appear in spring and sporadically throughout the year.

The species was  formally described in 1839 based on plant material collected in the Swan River Colony. The species was transferred to the genus Billardiera in 1972  but this was reversed in 2004.

References

Apiales of Australia
Pittosporaceae
Flora of Western Australia